Energy: A National Issue is a 1977 American animated educational film featuring characters from The Flintstones franchise and narrated by Charlton Heston. It was produced in 1976 by Hanna-Barbera Productions for the Center for Strategic and International Studies of Georgetown University and was also the final Flintstones production to feature Alan Reed as the voice of Fred Flintstone, recorded very shortly before his death in 1977. The film was distributed to schools on 16 mm format and was also broadcast that year in many areas as a syndicated television special.

Plot
The film opens in prehistoric times where Fred Flintstone and his wife Wilma rely on a dwindling wood supply for their thermal and cooking needs. While their pet dinosaur Dino watches, Fred begins to chip away at black rocks, believing they could offer a power that is not immediately apparent by their inert state. Later, as Wilma is serving him an elaborate vegetarian lunch, Fred tells her he encountered a travelling stranger who agreed to accept the black rocks in exchange for a bow and arrow which Fred refers to as a "cat gut on a stick spear thrower" device. Fred uses this new device as a toy, unaware of its full potential.

Fred and Wilma are then propelled across the span of post-Stone Age civilization as the characters turn up in ancient Rome, the Renaissance, colonial America, post-Civil War America, and the suburban 1970s while addressing the difficulties in creating an energy self-sufficient society.  Fred is featured in a musical sequence singing and dancing about energy efficiency, while Wilma is shown as a then-contemporary politician trying to appease an agitated rally crowd that is doubting her competency on energy-related issues.

As Fred and Wilma discover many facts about energy and the economy, viewers realize they must use our energy sources more efficiently to buy time to solve the problem.

Voice cast
Charlton Heston as Narrator
Alan Reed as Fred Flintstone (singing provided by Henry Corden)
Jean Vander Pyl as Wilma Flintstone

Production credits
 Production Liaison: Sandra Granzow, Francis X. Murray, M. Jon Vondracek
 Technical Consultants: Jack H. Bridges, Joan Sandgren Bridges, Christa D.K. Dantzler, Roger W. Sant
 Produced by: Ross M. Sutherland
 Written and Directed by: Gerard H. Baldwin
 Voices: Alan Reed (Fred), Jean Vander Pyl (Wilma), Henry Corden (Fred's songs)
 Music: Dean Elliott
 Lyrics: John Bradford, Gerard H. Baldwin
 Design: Robert Dranko, Rosemary O'Connor, Walt Peregoy, Charles McElmurry, Roy Morita, Don Jurwich, Tom Knowles
 Backgrounds: Bob McIntosh, Gloria Wood, Eric Semones, Walt Peregoy
 Animation: Irv Spence, Oliver Callahan, Rudy Zamora, Fred Hellmich, Alan Zaslove, Bob Goe, Lee Mishkin, Frank Andrina, Mark Glamack, Fred Grable, Allen Wilsbach, Joel Seibel
 Assistant Director: Cindy Smith
 Sequence Director: Carl Urbano
 Editor: Greg Watson
 Camera: Jerry Smith, Frank Paiker
 Scene Planning: Cindy Smith, Evelyn Sherwood
 Sound: Dick Olson
 Ink & Paint: Billy Kerns
 Xerox: Star Wirth
 Graphics: Iraj Paran
 A HANNA-BARBERA PRODUCTION
 HANNA-BARBERA PRODUCTIONS, INC. ©MCMLXXVII All rights reserved.
 Distributed by AIMS Instructional Media Services, Inc. HOLLYWOOD, CALIFORNIA

References

External links
 

1977 animated films
1977 films
1977 television specials
1977 short films
1970s animated short films
1970s animated television specials
American animated short films
1970s educational films
The Flintstones films
The Flintstones television specials
Hanna-Barbera animated films
Films about energy
Animated films set in prehistory
Georgetown University
Films directed by Gerard Baldwin
1970s American films
American educational films